Somaliland Ports Authority (SPA) is a government agency responsible for the operation of three ports in Somaliland. The authorities headquarters are located in Hargeisa and Port of Berbera.

See also 
 Government of Somaliland
 Port of Berbera
 DP World Berbera New Port

References

External links 

 

Government of Somaliland
Port authorities